Neil Andrew Stovold (born 24 February 1983) is an English cricketer.  Stovold is a right-handed batsman who bowls right-arm off break.  He was born in Bristol.

Stovold represented the Gloucestershire Cricket Board in 3 List A matches.  These came against Herefordshire in the 2nd round of the 2001 Cheltenham & Gloucester Trophy, Huntingdonshire in the 1st round of the 2002 Cheltenham & Gloucester Trophy which was held in 2001, and the Surrey Cricket Board in the 1st round of the 2003 Cheltenham & Gloucester Trophy which was played in 2002.  In his 3 List A matches, he scored 111 runs at a batting average of 37.00, with a single half century high score of 75.  With the ball he took a single wicket at a bowling average of 58.00, with best figures of 1/33.

Family
His father, Andy, played first-class cricket for Gloucestershire, Orange Free State and the Marylebone Cricket Club.  His uncle, Martin, played first-class cricket for Gloucestershire.  His brother, Nicholas, also played List A cricket for the Gloucestershire Cricket Board.

References

External links
Neil Stovold at Cricinfo
Neil Stovold at CricketArchive

1983 births
Living people
Cricketers from Bristol
English cricketers
Gloucestershire Cricket Board cricketers